A pulsed energy weapon is any weapon that:
 uses pulses of electricity to fire a projectile, or
 operates by transferring electric current to its target.
These weapons often use large capacitors to build up a charge which is released when the weapon is fired. Large high-end systems sometimes use compulsators which store energy using rotational inertia. Weapons which do not use projectiles, such as the stun gun and laser gun, do not need any ammunition other than a power source.

Common pulsed energy weapons 

 Taser - A combination of a conventional weapon & electrical weapon
 Stun gun

Experimental pulsed energy weapons 

 Railgun
 Coilgun
 Certain lasers

Fictional pulsed energy weapons 

 Some rayguns and plasma rifles
 Weapons mounted on space ships in the Star Trek universe
 Most weapons used by advanced species in the Stargate universe
 The most common weapon type in the Farscape television series

References

See also

Directed energy weapon

Energy weapons